Euceriodes is a genus of moths in the family Erebidae first described by Travassos in 1961.

Species
Euceriodes pallada
Euceriodes wernickei

References

Arctiini
Moth genera